Gabriel Bujor (born 8 November 1990) is a Romanian handball player who plays for AHC Dunărea Călărași and the Romania national team.

Achievements 
Liga Națională: 
Silver Medalist: 2012, 2013, 2014

Individual awards 
 Liga Națională 
Top Scorer:2017, 2018

Personal life
He has a twin brother named Mihai Bujor who is also a handball player.

References
 

1990 births
Living people
People from Tecuci
Romanian male handball players
Twin sportspeople